Mirozg (also Romanized as Mīrozg and Mīrozk; also known as Mīrīz) is a village in Kahshang Rural District, in the Central District of Birjand County, South Khorasan Province, Iran. At the 2016 census, its population was 207, in 64 families.

References 

Populated places in Birjand County